Frank Petzold (born 1951) is a German composer, conductor and jazz pianist. A composer of operas and other stage works, he has worked at theatres, from 1994 as Kapellmeister at the Staatstheater Cottbus. He has lectured music theory and jazz piano at the Brandenburgische Technische Universität in Cottbus from 2001.

Life 
Petzold was born in Zwickau in 1951. He took piano lessons from age nine. He studied composition, conducting and piano at the Hochschule für Musik Carl Maria von Weber Dresden from 1968 to 1974, composition with Siegfried Köhler. He also worked as Kapellmeister for plays at the Theater Magdeburg from 1977 to 1979.

From 1977 to 1981 he studied composition with Rainer Kunad at the Academy of Arts, Berlin. He was a freelance composer and pianist in Magdeburg and Cottbus from 1981 to 1994, writing operas, orchestral music, chamber music, stage works and jazz music. In 1994, he became Kapellmeister at the Staatstheater Cottbus, and held the position to 2001, when he became also lecturer for music theory and jazz piano at the Brandenburgische Technische Universität in Cottbus from 2011.

Petzold is married; the couple has two sons.

Prize 
 Hans Stieber Prize for composition (1984)

Works

Stage works 
 1980/81: Das Kälberbrüten,  (Carnival play) after Hans Sachs for soprano, tenor, bass and six instruments. premiere: 1982.
 1986/87: Prinzessin Zartfuß und die sieben Elefanten, comic opera in one act based on the play of the same name by Albert Wendt, libretto by the composer, premiere: Theater der Stadt Cottbus, 1989.

Other compositions 
 1990: Sinfonie in F, premiered by the Dresden Philharmonic

Recordings 
 Tritonia (2000)
 Jazzterday Live (2005)

References

Further reading 
 Frank Petzold. In Sigrid Neef (with Hermann Neef): Deutsche Oper im 20. Jahrhundert. DDR 1949–1989. Lang, Berlin 1992, .

External links 
 
 

German jazz pianists
German choral conductors
20th-century classical composers
20th-century German composers
People from Zwickau

1951 births
Living people